Heathcote South is a locality in central Victoria, Australia.

References

Towns in Victoria (Australia)
Shire of Mitchell